Magali Yañez (born 5 August 1981) is a Mexican sprinter. She competed in the women's 4 × 400 metres relay at the 2004 Summer Olympics.

References

External links
 

1981 births
Living people
Athletes (track and field) at the 2004 Summer Olympics
Mexican female sprinters
Olympic athletes of Mexico
Place of birth missing (living people)
Olympic female sprinters